Gearoid Lyons (born 13 April 1995) is an Irish rugby union player. He plays for English side Nottingham in the RFU Championship. Lyons plays primarily as a fly-half.

Early life
Lyons captained Crescent College to a 27–5 victory against Rockwell College in the 2013 Munster Schools Rugby Senior Cup Final.

Nottingham
In May 2016, whilst still in the Munster Academy, Lyons signed a contract with English RFU Championship side Nottingham.

References

External links
Nottingham Profile
Munster Profile

Living people
1995 births
People educated at Crescent College
Rugby union players from County Limerick
Shannon RFC players
Irish rugby union players
Munster Rugby players
Rugby union fly-halves
Nottingham R.F.C. players
Ireland international rugby sevens players